The 1992–93 Campionato Sammarinese di Calcio season was the 8th season since its establishment. It was contested by 10 teams, and S.P. Tre Fiori won the championship.

Regular season

Results

Championship playoff

First round
F.C. Domagnano 5-1 S.P. Cailungo
S.S. Folgore/Falciano 6-6 (pen  4-3 ) A.C. Libertas

Second round
A.C. Libertas 2-2 (pen  3-2 ) S.P. Cailungo
S.S. Folgore/Falciano 2-1 F.C. Domagnano

Third round
F.C. Domagnano 2-0 A.C. Libertas
S.P. Tre Fiori 3-0 S.S. Folgore/Falciano

Semifinal
S.S. Folgore/Falciano 1-2 F.C. Domagnano

Final
S.P. Tre Fiori 2-0 F.C. Domagnano

References
San Marino - List of final tables (RSSSF)

Campionato Sammarinese di Calcio
San Marino
Campionato Sammarinese di Calcio